(Thomas) Michael Dexter FRS (born 15 May 1945) is a British haematologist and director of the Wellcome Trust, from 1998 to 2003.

Education
Dexter was inspired to take A levels at night school and went on study physiology and zoology at the University of Salford. After graduating, he continued in academia and received a PhD from the University of Manchester in 1974 for research into Leukemia. Dexter also received a Doctor of Science degree from the University of Salford in 1982.

Career
Dexter was visiting fellow at the Memorial Sloan–Kettering Cancer Center and a professor of haematology at the University of Manchester from 1985 to 1998.

He was director of the Paterson Institute for Cancer Research and the Wellcome Trust. He has authored over 360 articles in scientific journals including Nature and is an editor of four books.

Awards and honours
Dexter was elected a Fellow of the Royal Society (FRS) in 1991.

References

|-

1945 births
British medical administrators
Fellows of the Royal Society
Living people
Academics of the Victoria University of Manchester
British haematologists